Kosai can stand for:
 Hiroki Kosai, 20th-century Japanese astronomer
 Kosai, Shizuoka, Japan, a city
 Kōsai, a disciple of Hōnen of the Jōdo Shū Buddhist sect
 Kosai river, near Kharagpur in the Indian state of West Bengal
 Count Kosai Uchida (or Uchida Yasuya), 19th-20th-century Japanese statesman and diplomat
 Wiang Kosai, a national park in the Phrae and Lampang provinces of Thailand
 Kosai or koose, an African pea fritter

See also 
 Kozai (disambiguation)